The March 87C is a highly successful and extremely competitive open-wheel race car, designed and built by March Engineering, to compete in the 1986 IndyCar season, alongside the 85C and 86C. The season was another whitewash and a clean-sweep for March, following up on the success of their 1986 campaign. The 86C chassis dominated the season, winning 9 out of the 15 races, and taking 8 pole positions. The March 87C chassis successfully clinched the 1986 IndyCar championship with Bobby Rahal, and the 1987 Indianapolis 500, with Al Unser. It was powered by the Cosworth DFX turbo engine like its predecessors.

References

Racing cars
March vehicles
American Championship racing cars